Oedematopoda cypris is a moth in the Stathmopodidae family. It is found in India and Sri Lanka.

References

Stathmopodidae
Moths described in 1905
Taxa named by Edward Meyrick
Moths of Asia
Moths of Sri Lanka